Arthur John Brook (18 September 1844 – 19 December 1917) was an English cricketer.  Brook's batting style is unknown.  He was born at Bexhill-on-Sea, Sussex.

Brook made a single first-class appearance for Sussex against Kent at Ashford Road, Eastbourne in 1873.  He batted once in the match, in Sussex's first-innings of 302 all out, in which he scored 10 runs before being dismissed by William Coppinger.  Sussex won the match by an innings and 104 runs.

He died at Sidley, Sussex on 19 December 1917.

References

External links
Arthur Brook at ESPNcricinfo
Arthur Brook at CricketArchive

1844 births
1917 deaths
People from Bexhill-on-Sea
English cricketers
Sussex cricketers